Carver is a town in Plymouth County, Massachusetts, United States. The population was 11,645 at the 2020 census.  It is named for John Carver, the first governor of the Plymouth Colony. The town features two popular tourist attractions: Edaville USA theme park and King Richard's Faire, the largest and longest-running renaissance fair in New England.

History and overview
Archaeological research revealed 9,000 years of settlement at the Annasnappet Pond Site in Carver, from 10,000 to 1,000 years ago. The site contained 100,000 stone flakes, 1600 stone tools and a human burial.

Carver separated from Plympton, Massachusetts, and was incorporated in 1790 because many residents lived too far away to attend church in Plympton. The town was named for John Carver, the first Governor of the Plymouth Colony. Initially agricultural, Carver was known for the iron ore from its swamp lands used to make cooking tools by the 1730s. The first iron works was "Pope's Point Furnace", built in 1732, which operated for a century by using the bogs and Sampson's Pond. Over the next 150 years, sheep shearing and lumber mills were important in Carver.

Most people at the time lived in the villages of South and North Carver and Wenham, later called East Carver. European settlers had also given the names "Colchester" and "Lakenham" to what is now North Carver, and settled in what was known as South Meadow. Each village supported at least one schoolhouse. As the market for iron ore declined in the latter part of the 19th century, Carver began cranberry farming as a new use for the town's swamp lands. Farmers began growing cranberries in the 1870s, and by 1900 it was Carver's farmers who raised a fifth of all cranberries grown in the United States. A railroad line connected Carver to New York and Boston in 1920, further establishing the town.

Money from the iron helped the community to grow, as evidenced by several mansions still in existence in the town. Also located in Carver is Savery's Avenue, the first divided highway in America, which was opened to the public in 1860 by William Savery. The trees between the roads and on the outside of them were to be left for "shade and ornament for man and beast". Both road beds were macadamized in 1907. A portion of the expense was advanced by the daughters of the builder, Mrs. Mary P.S. Jowitt and Ms. H.D. Savery. By the 1940s the cranberry harvest was the largest in the world, and today it is still a major business in town. Because of the land taken for the bogs, however, growth is limited, giving the town a rural flavor it takes pride in. In 2012, most cranberry bogs are being replanted in favor of a new hybrid cranberry crop.

Carver also has two notable tourist attractions. Edaville Railroad is a narrow-gauge railroad attraction which opened in 1949. It has long been a family tourist attraction in Southeastern Massachusetts, especially for its festival of lights around Christmastime. It has experienced a revival in recent years, after being sold in 1991 and nearly closing. The town is also the site of King Richard's Faire, a re-creation of a 16th-century English fair which is open on weekends throughout September and October. It is New England's largest Renaissance fair.

Pro wrestler Mike Bennett is from Carver.

Geography 
It is locally famous for the large number of cranberry bogs throughout the town. Carver is bordered by Plympton to the north, Kingston to the northeast, Plymouth to the east, Wareham to the south, and Middleborough to the west.

Carver's geography is shaped by its many small brooks, rivers and ponds including Vaughn Pond and Bates Pond. The majority of them eventually drain into Buzzards Bay, although some in the north of town lead to Cape Cod Bay or Narragansett Bay. The town also has an abundance of pine and cedar trees, and a portion of Myles Standish State Forest takes up much of the southeast corner of town. A large cedar swamp occupies the geographic center of the town. The town is also the site of a campground, a sportsmen's club, and a small town park at the center of town.

Demographics 

As of the census of 2000, there were 11,163 people, 3,984 households, and 3,011 families residing in the town. The racial makeup of the town was 95.78% White, 1.22% African American, 0.10% Native American, 0.30% Asian, 0.01% Pacific Islander, 0.96% from other races, and 1.63% from two or more races. Hispanic or Latino of any race were 0.82% of the population.

The largest self-reported ancestry groups in East Carver are Irish (37.0%), Italian (26.5%), English (23.5%), French (6.8%) and Portuguese (5.4%)

There were 3,984 households, out of which 36.6% had children under the age of 18 living with them, 63.3% were married couples living together, 8.7% had a female householder with no husband present, and 24.4% were non-families. 19.7% of all households were made up of individuals, and 11.7% had someone living alone who was 65 years of age or older. The average household size was 2.80 and the average family size was 3.23.

In the town, the population was spread out, with 27.3% under the age of 18, 6.9% from 18 to 24, 28.3% from 25 to 44, 22.8% from 45 to 64, and 14.8% who were 65 years of age or older. The median age was 37 years. For every 100 females, there were 95.6 males. For every 100 females age 18 and over, there were 90.9 males.

The median income for a household in the town was $53,506, and the median income for a family was $61,738. Males had a median income of $46,414 versus $28,336 for females. The per capita income for the town was $20,398. About 4.6% of families and 5.0% of the population were below the poverty line, including 3.1% of those under age 18 and 10.8% of those age 65 or over.

Government 
Carver is represented in the Massachusetts House of Representatives as a part of the Second Plymouth district, which also includes Wareham and a portion of Middleborough. The town is represented in the Massachusetts Senate as a part of the First Plymouth and Bristol district, which includes Berkley, Bridgewater, Dighton, Marion, Middleborough, Raynham, Taunton and Wareham. The town is patrolled by the Fourth (Middleborough) Barracks of Troop D of the Massachusetts State Police.

On the national level, Carver is a part of Massachusetts's 9th congressional district, and is currently represented by Bill Keating. The state's senior (Class I) member of the United States Senate, elected in 2012, is Elizabeth Warren. The junior (Class II) senator is Ed Markey, who was elected in 2013 to finish John Kerry's term when he became Secretary of State.

Carver is governed by the open town meeting form of government, led by a town administrator and a board of selectmen. Carver has its own police, ALS ambulance and fire departments, with a central police station, central ambulance station and three on-call firehouses, located in the north, south and center of town.

There are also three post offices. The main ZIP code is 02330. There was also 2 other P.O. Box zip codes 02355 (North Carver Post Office) and 02366 (South Carver Post Office) originally. Now all three ZIP codes are used for general mail. 02330 All of Carver (but mainly Center Carver), 02355 (North Carver or East Carver), and 02366 (South Carver). The town's public library is located in the center of town, and is a part of the SAILS Library Network.

Education 
Carver operates its own school department, led by a school committee and a superintendent of schools. There are two schools, each of which serves specific grade levels. The Carver Elementary serves pre-kindergarten through fifth grades; and the Carver Middle-High School serves sixth through twelfth grades.

In addition to the town high school, students may also choose to attend Old Colony Regional Vocational Technical High School in Rochester. They may also choose to attend Norfolk County Agricultural High School in Walpole or Bristol County Agricultural High School in Dighton. There are no private schools in the town; the nearest are in Kingston, Lakeville and Taunton.

Transportation Department 
Carver operates and owns their own buses for Carver and all out of district schools except Old Colony Regional. For the middle-high school they also run a late bus Monday to Thursday, and not on half days.

Transportation 
The town is crossed in the north of town by U.S. Route 44, a two-lane divided highway which meets Route 3 in Plymouth. The highway was recently expanded, so that rather than the highway portion ending at Route 58 (the other main route), whose right-of-way extends into Carver to a few miles after the Carver/Wareham town line. The nearest national and international airport is Logan International Airport in Boston. Another national and international airport nearby is T. F. Green Airport in Warwick, Rhode Island, which most residents prefer due to short security wait times.

References

External links 

 

 
Towns in Plymouth County, Massachusetts
Towns in Massachusetts